Benjamin Rudolph Frey (April 6, 1906 – November 1, 1937) was a right-handed pitcher in Major League Baseball from 1929 to 1936, playing primarily with the Cincinnati Reds. Frey appeared in 256 major league baseball games (127 as a starter) and had a lifetime record of 57–82 in 1160 innings pitched. He was a sidearm pitcher with a sweeping motion that was effective against right-handed hitters. His lifetime earned run average of 4.50 was good for an adjusted ERA+ of 90. Frey suffered an arm injury which ultimately led to his retirement and subsequent suicide.

Biography
Frey was born in Dexter, Michigan. After spending time with the Toledo Mud Hens, he entered the major leagues in 1929 with the Cincinnati Reds. In 1930, Frey lost 18 games, most in the National League. His best season was 1934 when he was 11–16 for the Reds with a 3.52 ERA (adjusted ERA+ of 116), finishing sixteenth in the 1934 National League Most Valuable Player voting. Frey suffered an arm injury and was sent down to a minor league team in Nashville for the 1937 season. Frey refused to report to Nashville and asked to be put on the voluntarily retired list.

Frey committed suicide on November 1, 1937, in Spring Arbor Township, Michigan, at the home of his sister. He had run a hose from his car's exhaust into the back seat and died of carbon monoxide poisoning. Frey had been in despair over his injured arm, which he did not think would ever recover sufficiently for a return to the major leagues.

References

External links

1906 births
1937 suicides
Baseball players from Michigan
People from Dexter, Michigan
Major League Baseball pitchers
Cincinnati Reds players
St. Louis Cardinals players
Suicides in Michigan
Suicides by carbon monoxide poisoning
Nashville Vols players